Mary Kuksie Twala (14 September 1939 – 4 July 2020) was a South African actress. In 2011, she was nominated for Africa Movie Academy Award for Best Actress in a Supporting Role.

Career

Twala featured in several South African local productions. She had a guest role in the first season of Generations. In 2007, she starred in local drama, Ubizo: The Calling. In 2010, she played a supporting role in Hopeville, the film won numerous awards in several festivals and award ceremonies. Twala played "Ma Dolly" in the film, which earned her a Best Supporting Actress nomination in the 6th Africa Movie Academy Awards. After undergoing a medical procedure that kept her out of filming for months, Twala made a comeback in Vaya in 2015.

In 2016, she was one of the ensemble cast in Comatose, a film that featured top acts across Africa including Bimbo Akintola and Hakeem Kae-Kazim. In 2017, she played a supporting role in the sport film, Beyond the River. By October 2017, it was announced that Twala would feature in a new television drama series on Mzanzi Magic, The Imposter.

Selected filmography
 Life, Above All
 Beat the Drum
 Leading Lady
 Ghost Son
 Mapantsula (1988)
 Sarafina! (1992)
 Hopeville
 State of Violence (2010)
 This Is Not a Burial, It's a Resurrection (2019)
 Black Is King (2020)

Personal life

Twala was born 14 September 1939 in Soweto Johannesburg. She was married to actor Ndaba Mhlongo until his death in 1989. They were the parents of Somizi Mhlongo and Archie Mhlongo (deceased 1985).

Death 

Twala died on July 4, 2020 at around 11am at Parklane private hospital, Johannesburg. She was laid to rest on July 9, 2020 in Soweto. Due to Covid-19 regulations, her funeral could be attended by no more than 50 people.

References

External links
 

1939 births
2020 deaths
People from Johannesburg
Place of death missing
20th-century South African actresses
21st-century South African actresses
South African television actresses